Jurani Francisco Ferreira (born 1 October 1996), known as Ratinho, is a Brazilian professional footballer who plays as a midfielder for Londrina.

Professional career
Ratinho made his professional debut with Goiás in a 2-1 Campeonato Brasileiro Série B win over Atlético Clube Goianiense on 15 February 2018.

Honours
Gwangju
K League 2: 2019

References

External links
 

1996 births
Living people
Sportspeople from Goiás
Brazilian footballers
Association football midfielders
Associação Olímpica de Itabaiana players
Goiás Esporte Clube players
Paysandu Sport Club players
Londrina Esporte Clube players
Gwangju FC players
Campeonato Brasileiro Série A players
Campeonato Brasileiro Série B players
Campeonato Brasileiro Série C players
K League 2 players
Brazilian expatriate footballers
Expatriate footballers in South Korea